Perneb is the name of an ancient Egyptian prince and priest, who lived at the beginning of the 2nd Dynasty.

Identity 
Perneb's name is preserved on several clay seals found in the gallery tomb A at Saqqara, which is attributed to two kings (pharaohs) at the same time (king Hotepsekhemwy and king Raneb). This circumstance lead to disputes about the family origin of Perneb; it cannot be said for sure whose son he exactly was.

Perneb became known for a very rare and unusual title: he was priest of Sopdu, a deity which was rarely named in early Egypt. His cult center was somewhere in the eastern Nile Delta at a city called Iptjw. The exact geographical position of this town is not known. It is also unknown where Perneb was interred.

References 

Ancient Egyptian princes
3rd-millennium BC births
3rd-millennium BC deaths